John Stanley Webster (February 22, 1877 – December 24, 1962) was a justice of the Washington Supreme Court, a United States representative from Washington and a United States district judge of the United States District Court for the Eastern District of Washington.

Education and career

Born on February 22, 1877, in Cynthiana, Harrison County, Kentucky, Webster attended the public schools and Smith's Classical School for Boys. He attended the University of Michigan Law School. He was admitted to the bar and entered private practice in Cynthiana from 1899 to 1906. He was prosecutor for Harrison County from 1902 to 1906. He moved west for his health to work a small ranch near Colbert, Washington, just north of Spokane, Washington in May 1906. He was chief assistant prosecutor for Spokane from 1907 to 1909. He was a Judge of the Superior Court of the State of Washington for Spokane County from 1909 to 1916. He was a lecturer on criminal and elementary law at Gonzaga University in Spokane. Webster was easily elected to a six-year term as an associate justice of the Washington Supreme Court in Olympia in 1916, and appointed early, November 20 by Governor Ernest Lister, to fill the vacancy. He resigned in May 1918 to run for United States Congress.

Congressional service

Webster was elected as a Republican from Washington's 5th congressional district to the United States House of Representatives of the 66th, 67th and 68th United States Congresses and served from March 4, 1919, to May 8, 1923, when he resigned to accept a federal judgeship.

Federal judicial service

Webster received a recess appointment from President Warren G. Harding on April 28, 1923, to a seat on the United States District Court for the Eastern District of Washington vacated by Judge Frank H. Rudkin. He was nominated to the same position by President Calvin Coolidge on December 15, 1923. He was confirmed by the United States Senate on January 16, 1924, and received his commission the same day. He assumed senior status due to a certified disability on August 31, 1939. His service terminated on December 24, 1962, due to his death in Spokane, where he resided. His remains were cremated and interred in Oakesdale Cemetery in Oakesdale, Washington, his wife's hometown in Whitman County, where her father John Lathrum (1853–1902) had been sheriff. Mary Gertrude (Lathrum) Webster (1887–1956), his wife of 48 years, had died six years earlier. His older brother, Richard M. Webster (1869–1953), moved to eastern Washington in 1904 and also served as a judge in Spokane.

Other service

Webster briefly served as the president of the Western International League (WIL) in minor league baseball, a predecessor of the Northwest League, and resigned in February 1941.

References

Sources

External links
 Temple of Justice.org – Justice John Stanley Webster
 Washington Secretary of State – History Makers – John Stanley Webster
 Washington State University Libraries – John Stanley Webster – papers 1901-1963
 

1877 births
1962 deaths
Judges of the United States District Court for the Eastern District of Washington
United States district court judges appointed by Warren G. Harding
20th-century American judges
University of Michigan Law School alumni
Republican Party members of the United States House of Representatives from Washington (state)